Juan Francisco Rago (born 31 October 1988) is an Argentine professional footballer who plays as a goalkeeper for Atlanta.

Career
Rago had youth spells with Argentinos del Sud and Godoy Cruz. Sportivo Barracas gave Rago his start in senior football, selecting him forty-one times in Primera C Metropolitana for two years from 2008. In 2010, Rago moved across to the other fourth tier, Torneo Argentino B, to join Atlético Policial. Nine appearances followed. A subsequent spell in Torneo Argentino C with General Güemes came, prior to a return to tier four with Mitre. In 2013, Rago joined fellow Santiago del Estero outfit Central Córdoba. He made his debut versus San Jorge in October, which was the first of twenty-two matches for the club throughout 2013–14.

Rago was signed by Torneo Federal B's Güemes in 2014, which preceded him playing in the same division for Libertad de Concordia to end 2015. Torneo Federal A's Ferro Carril Oeste became Rago's eighth senior team on 1 January 2016. Fifteen appearances arrived in season one, which culminated with him receiving a red card in a defeat to Unión Aconquija in May 2016's promotion play-offs. After two campaigns with the club, Rago departed to spend 2017–18 with Alvarado. In June 2018, Rago completed a move to Atlanta of Primera B Metropolitana. His bow for them in August ended in a 4–0 win over Tristán Suárez.

Personal life
Rago's father, Francisco, was a footballer - he also played for Alvarado.

Career statistics
.

References

External links

1988 births
Living people
Sportspeople from Mar del Plata
Argentine footballers
Association football goalkeepers
Primera C Metropolitana players
Torneo Argentino B players
Torneo Argentino C players
Torneo Argentino A players
Torneo Federal A players
Primera B Metropolitana players
Sportivo Barracas players
Atlético Policial players
Club Atlético Mitre footballers
Central Córdoba de Santiago del Estero footballers
Club Atlético Alvarado players
Club Atlético Atlanta footballers